Melanella becki is a species of sea snail, a marine gastropod mollusk in the family Eulimidae. The species is one of many species known to exist within the genus, Melanella.

References

External links
 To World Register of Marine Species

becki
Gastropods described in 1932